Dioscorea andromedusae is a herbaceous vine in the genus Dioscorea which is native to Peru, where the type specimen was collected from the hillside grottos of the San Andres.

References

andromedusae